Balçılı (also, Bolçalı) is a village and municipality in the Goygol Rayon of Azerbaijan.  It has a population of 1,945.

References 

Populated places in Goygol District